Wolfgang Lange may refer to:

 Wolfgang Lange (philologist) (1915–1984), German philologist
 Wolfgang Lange (general) (1898–1988), German general
 Wolfgang Lange (canoeist) (1938–2022), German canoeist